The 2016 Nielsen Pro Tennis Championship is a professional tennis tournament played on hard courts. It is the 25th edition of the tournament which is part of the 2016 ATP Challenger Tour. It will take place in Winnetka, Illinois, between 4 and 10 July 2016.

Singles main-draw entrants

Seeds

 1 Rankings are as of June 27, 2016.

Other entrants
The following players received wildcards into the singles main draw:
  Tom Fawcett
  Jared Hiltzik
  Mackenzie McDonald
  Alex Rybakov

The following player received entry into the singles main draw with a protected ranking:
  Blaž Kavčič

The following players received entry from the qualifying draw:
  Adrien Bossel
  Alex Kuznetsov
  Dennis Nevolo
  Ryan Shane

Champions

Singles

  Yoshihito Nishioka def.  Frances Tiafoe, 6–3, 6–2

Doubles

  Stefan Kozlov /  John-Patrick Smith def.  Sekou Bangoura /  David O'Hare, 6–3, 6–3

External links
Official website

Nielsen Pro Tennis Championship
Nielsen Pro Tennis Championship
Nielsen
Nielsen Pro Tennis Championship
Nielsen Pro Tennis Championship